The Hyatt Regency Chicago is a  Hyatt hotel on East Wacker Drive in Chicago, Illinois. The hotel operates over 2,019 guest rooms in two different towers which were constructed in 1974 and 1980. The towers are connected by both an above-ground skyway and an underground concourse. This underground concourse is considered to be part of the Chicago Pedway. The conference center has been home to such events as the 40th,  49th, 58th, 70th and 80th World Science Fiction Conventions in 1982, 1991, 2000, 2012, and 2022 respectively.

The West tower includes the Regency Club on the 35th floor. Other amenities include a fitness center, a game area, two full-service restaurants, and a bar.

Rooms facing north have an unobstructed view of the Chicago River. Rooms facing east may be able to see Lake Michigan, but the view is obstructed by both Columbus Plaza and Three Illinois Center. Rooms facing west have a view of Illinois Center. Rooms facing south may be able to see other areas of The Loop, but may be obstructed by the Park Millennium Condominiums or Illinois Center. All rooms have a view of the streets below.

History
In 1988, the hotel was purchased by Japan-based company.

Popular culture
The West Tower was a filming location for the 1977 film Rollercoaster.

References

External links
Emporis.com - Building ID 116745 (West Tower)
Emporis.com - Building ID 116746 (East Tower)

Hotels in Chicago
Hyatt Hotels and Resorts
Hotel buildings completed in 1974
Hotel buildings completed in 1980
Twin towers
Hotels established in 1974
1974 establishments in Illinois